Governor William Owsley House, also known as Pleasant Retreat, is a historic house located in Lancaster, Kentucky on U.S. 27. The house was the home of Kentucky Governor William Owsley. The property has been restored and is now a museum.

History
The three story Federal-style house was built in 1804.

Current
The house was added to the U.S. National Register of Historic Places in 1975.

In April 1994, the Garrard County Historical Society purchased the property; and after restoration, Pleasant Retreat opened as a museum in June 1997.
It is now (2021) currently owned by a Garrard County local couple. They own the restaurant next to it, they have murder mysteries and hold teas at the mansion to uphold its classic and historic background.

References

External links
Governor William Owsley House website
Owsley Family Historical Society website

Houses on the National Register of Historic Places in Kentucky
Houses completed in 1804
Historic house museums in Kentucky
Museums in Garrard County, Kentucky
Houses in Garrard County, Kentucky
National Register of Historic Places in Garrard County, Kentucky
Plantations in Kentucky
1804 establishments in Kentucky
Federal architecture in Kentucky